Gatland is a surname. Notable people with the surname include:

 Bryn Gatland (born 1995), New Zealand rugby union player, son of Warren
 Maria Gatland (born 1948), former Conservative councillor in London, former IRA member 
 Warren Gatland (born 1963), New Zealand rugby union coach